The Piedras River (Spanish: Río Piedras) is a river of Puerto Rico in the municipality of Utuado. This is one of many rivers with this name in Puerto Rico.

See also
List of rivers of Puerto Rico

References

External links
 USGS Hydrologic Unit Map – Caribbean Region (1974)
Rios de Puerto Rico

Rivers of Puerto Rico
Utuado, Puerto Rico